Sungai Acheh is a state constituency in Penang, Malaysia, that has been represented in the Penang State Legislative Assembly.

The state constituency was first contested in 1974 and is mandated to return a single Assemblyman to the Penang State Legislative Assembly under the first-past-the-post voting system. , the State Assemblyman for Sungai Acheh is Zulkifli Ibrahim.

Definition

Polling districts 
According to the federal gazette issued on 30 March 2018, the Sungai Acheh constituency is divided into 7 polling districts.

Demographics

History

Election results

See also 
 Constituencies of Penang

References

Penang state constituencies